Linguistic validation is the process of investigating the reliability, conceptual equivalence, and content validity of translations of patient-reported outcome (PRO) measures.

Methodology 
Most usually, linguistic validation refers to a process whereby translated text is actively tested with patients in the target population and target language group through cognitive debriefing interviews. For example, if the PRO instrument is intended to measure the symptoms of diabetes in a trial in Denmark, the linguistic validation interviews would be conducted with diabetic patients in Denmark, who speak Danish as their mother tongue. This interview exercise ensures that items are appropriate for use in the target population, are clearly expressed and understood. The exercise is also an important tool for demonstrating content validity when compared with the source. During the interview, the respondents complete the questionnaire, and then answer a series of open-ended questions on its content and explain what they think each item means in their own words. The results of this cognitive debriefing exercise should therefore show the respondents' understanding of the translation, and alterations can be made after this stage if nuances of meaning in the source text have not been clearly expressed in the translation and understood by the respondents. The process also ensures multi-lingual harmonization of the translations, by making sure that the questionnaire is understood in the same way by target populations across all language groups, thus ensuring that the resulting quantitative data can be compared across language groups.

An alternative method of conducting linguistic validation is to ask a clinician who specialises in working with the target population to review the text, to ensure that it is clearly understandable. The clinician's understanding and knowledge of the usual terminology and phrases used by the patient group can be utilised, thus ensuring that the wording used in the translation reflects that which would be used by the target patient group themselves. Some parties feel that this step is sufficient to validate a PRO translation. However, regulatory authorities consider it preferable to validate measures through the above-mentioned cognitive debriefing with the patients in the target population where possible, and clinician reviews are more usually reserved for clinician-reported measures, or for particular circumstances in which testing with patients in the target population is particularly problematic (Wild et al. 2005).

Some companies use the term 'linguistic validation' to refer to the entire process for the translation of PRO measures as described in the 'Principles of Good Practice' (Wild et al. 2005), and the International Society for Pharmacoeconomics and Outcomes Research (ISPOR) Task Force report (Wild et al. 2009), even if this process does not include patient interviews or a clinician review. The recommended methodology utilises double, independently created translations into the target language, which are then combined into a 'reconciled version' which uses the best of both forward translations. The reconciled version, or harmonization, is then back translated (back translation) by two individual blinded translators who have no previous knowledge of the original questionnaire. The back translations are used as a window into the translated version, so that the project manager can assess whether the translated version accurately assesses the concepts measured by the source questionnaire. This stage is described as the back translation review. Ideally, it would be followed by patient interviews or a clinician review. Please note however, PROs should not be confused with PCOs, or patient-centered outcomes. PCOs implies the use of a questionnaire covering issues and concerns that are specific to a patient.

A comprehensive linguistic validation process including cognitive debriefing is vital to demonstrate content validity in translations for use in a U.S. Food and Drug Administration (FDA) submission.

References

External links 
U.S. Food and Drug Administration
The International Society for Pharmoeconomics and Outcomes Research
 Mapi 

Clinical research
Translation